David Allan Sampson (born July 2, 1957) is the president and CEO of the Property Casualty Insurers Association of America (PCI), headquartered in Chicago, Illinois. He was born in Washington, Indiana. He joined PCI in September 2007.

He was previously United States Deputy Secretary of Commerce and took the oath of office on July 27, 2005. As Deputy Secretary he was the Department of Commerce's chief operating officer and managed a US$6.5 billion budget and 38,000 employees in the 13 operating units. Sampson also served on President George W. Bush's management council and was a member of the board of directors for the Overseas Private Investment Corporation.

Sampson is a B.A. graduate of Lipscomb University and holds the degree of M.Th. from New Orleans Baptist Theological Seminary (NOBTS), being valedictorian in both classes at both institutions. On graduation from Lipscomb and while attending NOBTS, he served as minister of the Westchurch Church of Christ in Hammond, Louisiana. He was the first individual to receive the D.Min. degree at Abilene Christian University. During his studies in Abilene he was minister of the Park Row Church of Christ in Arlington, Texas, prior to selection as chief executive officer of the Arlington Chamber of Commerce. He completed the Program for Senior Executives at Harvard Kennedy School in 1999. Sampson and his family reside in Northern Virginia.

PCI background 
As president & CEO of the Property Casualty Insurers Association of America (PCI), Sampson represents more than 1,000 member companies that write 40 percent of the nation's property and casualty insurance. Sampson's combination of extensive financial services and management experience, global perspective, and political understandings made him a fitting leader for the property casualty insurance industry during extraordinary challenges.

As president of PCI and its affiliates, Sampson oversees 240 staff and a $40 million budget. He leads and manages one of the most diverse trade groups in the nation, with members writing virtually every type of personal and commercial coverage sold in the United States. On behalf of the PCI member companies, Sampson effectively advocates the association's positions to state, federal, and international public policy makers to prevent unintended consequences and focus lawmakers on good regulatory principles.

Sampson advocates on behalf of insurer and consumer interests on issues ranging from natural catastrophe funding and regulatory reform to personal finance. In his role as the voice for property casualty insurers, he is a frequent speaker at events, such as the American Farm Bureau Federation Annual Meeting and the International Insurance Foundation Annual Meeting Symposium.

Prior to joining PCI on September 4, 2007, Sampson served in two presidential-appointed and Senate-confirmed positions.  Most recently, he was the deputy secretary of the U.S. Department of Commerce. As the department's chief operating officer he managed a $11 billion budget and 38,000 employees and was responsible for the day-to-day operations of an agency with one of the broadest portfolios in federal government. Sampson traveled worldwide to promote opportunities for U.S. companies during his tenure as deputy secretary of Commerce, and he saw firsthand the interconnectedness of the American and global economies. Previously, Sampson served as Assistant Secretary of Commerce for Economic Development and managed the Economic Development Administration's $400 million budget and $2.5 billion portfolio of federal economic grants and loans.

ISS background 
In addition to serving as PCI president & CEO, Sampson is also president of the Independent Statistical Service (ISS), a wholly owned subsidiary of PCI and one of the industry's largest and most trusted statistical agents. ISS works with more than 450 property casualty companies of all sizes that report more than $900 billion in annual premiums.

Other appointments 
Board of Directors of the Insurance Institute for Highway Safety
Member of the U.S. Chamber of Commerce's "Association Committee of 100"
Assistant Secretary of Commerce for Economic Development
Chief of the Economic Development Administration
Chair of the Texas Council on Workforce and Economic Competitiveness
Vice Chair of the Texas Strategic Economic Development Planning Commission
President and chief executive officer of the Arlington, Texas Chamber of Commerce

References 

1957 births
Living people
Abilene Christian University alumni
American members of the Churches of Christ
George W. Bush administration personnel
Harvard Kennedy School alumni
Lipscomb University alumni
Louisiana Republicans
New Orleans Baptist Theological Seminary alumni
People from Arlington, Texas
People from Hammond, Louisiana
Texas Republicans
United States Deputy Secretaries of Commerce
American chief operating officers